The Lamprosomatinae are a small subfamily of leaf beetles (Chrysomelidae). They belong to the case-bearing Camptosomata.

Tribes and genera
The subfamily contains 14 extant genera, and 3 extinct genera, in four tribes:

Tribe Cachiporrini Chamorro & Konstantinov, 2011:
 Cachiporra Chamorro & Konstantinov, 2011
Tribe Lamprosomatini Lacordaire, 1848:
 †Archelamprosomius Bukejs & Nadein, 2015
 Asisia Bezděk, Löbl & Konstantinov, 2010 (replacement name for Guggenheimia Monrós, 1956)
 †Damzenius Bukejs, 2019
 Dorisina Monrós, 1956
 Lamprosoma Kirby, 1819
 Lamprosomoides Monrós, 1958
 Lychnophaes Lacordaire, 1848
 Oomorphoides Monrós, 1956
 Oomorphus Curtis, 1831
 Oyarzuna Bechyné, 1950
 Scrophoomorphus Medvedev, 1968
 †Succinoomorphus Bukejs & Nadein, 2015
 Xenoomorphus Monrós, 1956
Tribe Neochlamysini Monrós, 1959:
 Neochlamys Jacoby, 1882
 Pseudolychnophaes Achard, 1914
Tribe Sphaerocharini Chapuis, 1874:
 Sphaerocharis Lacordaire, 1848

References

Chrysomelidae
Beetle subfamilies
Taxa named by Jean Théodore Lacordaire